George Kirkwood is a Canadian retired ice hockey goaltender who backstopped Denver to consecutive National Championships in the early 1960s.

Career
Kirkwood played junior hockey in his hometown of Edmonton for several years. His teams played well but he couldn't get any interest from professional teams. After exhausting his eligibility in 1957 Kirkwood was out of organized hockey for a year before Murray Armstrong brought him to Denver after the Pioneers captured their first championship. Kirkwood played on the freshman team before joining the varsity squad in 1959 and became an instant success for the Pios. As a sophomore, Kirkwood helped lead Denver to a top finish in the inaugural WCHA season and was named co-Sophomore of the Year He was named to the All-WCHA First Team but was left off of the All-American roster as some believed his success was more a function of the team's dominance rather than his own play.

In the first WCHA Tournament, Kirkwood surrendered 3 goals in 2 games to help Denver win the western bracket and be declared co-champions. The second win gave Kirkwood his 25th win of the season, breaking the NCAA record not only for first year players, but for any goaltender in one campaign. Denver was the favorite in the NCAA Tournament and did not disappoint, winning both games to capture their second championship. Kirkwood was named to the All-Tournament Second Team for his steady performance in goal.

The next season Denver was a powerhouse who dominated almost every team they faced. The team won 30 of their 32 games with Kirkwood between the pipes for every minute. Kirkwood became the first goaltender to win 30 games in a season and set program records with a goals against average of 1.84 and a save percentage of .910. He was first team All-WCHA and was one of 5 Pioneers to appear on the AHCA All-American team. The team ran through the postseason, eviscerating the competition. In the two-game conference series, Denver won by the largest margin in history (17–3) and nearly accomplished the same in the national tournament. They dropped Minnesota 6–1 in the semifinal before torching St. Lawrence 12–2 in the title game. The win over the Saints was the largest for any championship match while their overall +15 margin was second only to Colorado College in 1950.

Despite having a year of eligibility left, Kirkwood ended his career after the 1961 season, perhaps knowing that he wasn't likely to play with a team as dominant as the '61 Pioneers ever again. He was inducted into the Denver Athletic Hall of Fame in 2007 and is still remembered as one of the best goaltenders ever to play for Maroon and Gold.

Statistics

Regular season and playoffs

Awards and honors

References

External links

1937 births
Living people
Ice hockey people from Edmonton
Canadian ice hockey goaltenders
Edmonton Flyers (WHL) players
Edmonton Oil Kings (WCHL) players
Denver Pioneers men's ice hockey players
NCAA men's ice hockey national champions
AHCA Division I men's ice hockey All-Americans